Myldred Jones (born August 5, 1909 in Philadelphia, Pennsylvania, died June 19, 2006 in Los Alamitos, California) was a US Navy officer and a consultant to then California Governor Ronald Reagan on youth and homelessness.

Early life 
Jones attended Wittenburg University in Springfield, Ohio, where she studied social sciences and religious education.  After graduation, Jones worked as a teacher, social worker, and juvenile probation officer.  She then entered the Navy, where she served for 17 years.  Jones retired with the rank of Lieutenant Commander. 

After leaving the Navy, Jones worked as a liaison officer with the United Nations and as a civil rights activist.

Youth services 
During the 1960s Jones became a consultant for Governor Ronald Reagan. She initiated research on youth and homeless shelters in California.  In 1968,  Jones started the first adolescent hotline.  Since opening, the hotline has reached over 600,000 people. Each month, over 2,000 people call it.

In 1978, Jones started Casa de Bienvenidos, a youth shelter.  To finance the shelter, she sold her house.  The shelter provides short term and extended placement programs, counseling, a school outreach program, a youth leadership program, and parenting classes. Since opening, Casa de Bienvenidos has served over 10,000 youth who have spent over 91,000 nights there.

Awards 
Presidential Recognition Award for Community Service awarded by President Ronald Reagan, 1988
Pope John XXIII Award, 1995

References

1909 births
2006 deaths
20th-century American naval officers
People from Philadelphia
Wittenberg University alumni